Fornham St Genevieve is a village and civil parish in the West Suffolk district of Suffolk in eastern England.

Location
In 2005 its population was 110. Its parish council is shared with neighbouring Fornham St Martin, and is known as Fornham St Martin cum St Genevieve Parish Council.

Etymology
The village name is derived from the Old English for 'Trout Homestead' for Fornham with the addition of the dedication to Saint Genevieve.

History
The Domesday Book records that the population of Fornham St Genevieve in 1086 was 30 households. The history of Fornham Park involved the scene of the Battle of Fornham in 1173. Robert Whitehand Earl of Leicester put up his final stand against the forces of Henry II near the church, and was subsequently captured and taken prisoner.

Fornham St Genevieve was formed from the Fornham Hall estate, designed by Capability Brown. The parish church was constructed around the 14th century from rubble flint, and included at least one memorial to the Tyldesley family. It was accidentally burned down on 19 May 1775, reputedly owing to the negligence of a man shooting jack daws that had lodged in the steeple. The remaining tower was Grade II* listed in 1955. Brown visited the estate after the fire and produced details plans for the estate, but died in 1783 before development could begin.

Transport
The B1106 is the main road through the village. Owing to an historical accident, there is now a roundabout in which four of the five exits have the same number.

See also
Fornham All Saints
Fornham St Martin

References

Villages in Suffolk
Civil parishes in Suffolk
Borough of St Edmundsbury
Thedwastre Hundred